The 2007 Boston College Eagles football team represented Boston College during the 2007 NCAA Division I FBS football season. It was Boston College's third season as a member of the Atlantic Coast Conference (ACC). The Eagles were led by Jeff Jagodzinski in his first season as Boston College head coach. Boston College has been a member of the Atlantic Coast Conference's (ACC) Atlantic Division since joining the league in 2005, after leaving the Big East Conference. The Eagles played their home games in 2007 at Alumni Stadium in Chestnut Hill, Massachusetts, which has been their home stadium since 1957.

Schedule

Rankings

Roster

Offense
QB Matt Ryan
RB Andre Callender
RB L. V. Whitworth
WR Rich Gunnell
WR Kevin Challenger
WR Brandon Robinson
TE Ryan Purvis
OL Anthony Castonzo
OL Gosder Cherilus

Defense
DL Ron Brace
DL Nick Larkin
DL/LB Alex Albright
LB Mark Herzlich
LB Jolonn Dunbar
LB/DB Kevin Akins
DB Jamie Silva
DB Dejuan Tribble
DB Paul Anderson

Special Teams
K Steve Aponavicius
P Johnny Ayers

Drafted Players (2008 NFL Draft)

References

Boston College
Boston College Eagles football seasons
Cheez-It Bowl champion seasons
Boston College Eagles football
Boston College Eagles football